The World Long Distance Mountain Running Championships (from 2004 up to 2014 the name was World Long Distance Mountain Running Challenge),  is an annual international mountain running competition organised by the World Mountain Running Association (WMRA).

The race is a one-day long-distance running contest for both sexes which has individual and national team aspects. The challenge does not take place on specially-made courses, but rather it is incorporated into pre-existing, traditional races.

The competition was first held in 2004 on a course from Sierre to Zinal. Since its inception, the challenge has been hosted at competitions including the Three Peaks Race in the United Kingdom, Switzerland's Jungfrau Marathon, and the Pikes Peak Marathon in the United States. The event has significant variance in its level of participation: the 2007 race at the Jungfrau Marathon attracted over 4200 runners of fifty nationalities, while at the 2011 of the competition there were 405 runners representing a total of 18 countries.

Editions

Winners

Individual

Men

Women

Team

Men

Women

See also
World Mountain Running Championships
European Mountain Running Championships
Commonwealth Mountain and Ultradistance Running Championships
NACAC Mountain Running Championships
South American Mountain Running Championships

References

External links
Event page at WMRA

 
Mountain running competitions
Long-distance running competitions
Mountain Running
Recurring sporting events established in 2004